Sanjeev Arora is a  theoretical computer scientist, it may also refer to 
 Sanjeev Arora (politician) from India
 Sanjeev Arora (physician) from USA